Austroaeschna parvistigma is a species of large dragonfly in the family Telephlebiidae, 
known as the swamp darner. 
It inhabits heavily vegetated and slow-flowing streams in eastern Australia, from northern New South Wales through Victoria, Tasmania and parts of South Australia.

Austroaeschna parvistigma is a very dark dragonfly with pale markings. It appears similar to the multi-spotted darner, Austroaeschna multipunctata, which inhabits mountain streams of southern New South Wales and eastern Victoria.

Gallery

See also
 List of dragonflies of Australia

References

Telephlebiidae
Odonata of Australia
Endemic fauna of Australia
Taxa named by Edmond de Sélys Longchamps
Insects described in 1883